The Francisco Morazán Championship was a yearly football tournament which was played in Honduras from 1947 to 1964.  The tournament included teams from the department of Francisco Morazán only and served as a qualification phase to the national championship, also known as the Honduran Amateur League.

Winners

By team

See also
 Honduran Amateur League

References

Francisco